As Long as I Live (French: Tant que je vivrai) is a 1946 French-Italian drama film directed by Jacques de Baroncelli and starring Edwige Feuillère, Jacques Berthier and Jean Debucourt. The film's sets were designed by the art director Guy de Gastyne. A wild-living woman on the run from the police falls in love with a consumptive pavement artist.

Main cast
 Edwige Feuillère as Ariane 
 Jacques Berthier as Bernard Fleuret  
 Jean Debucourt as Jean Marail  
 Marguerite Deval as La marquise  
 Germaine Kerjean as Madame Levallois  
 Georges Lannes as Miguel Brennan  
 Margo Lion as L'infirmière  
 Germaine Michel as Aubergiste  
 Maurice Nasil as Jacquelin  
 Freddy Alberti as Band Leader  
 Pierre Juvenet as Le docteur Monnier

References

Bibliography 
 Dayna Oscherwitz & MaryEllen Higgins. The A to Z of French Cinema. Scarecrow Press, 2009.

External links 
 

1946 films
Italian drama films
French drama films
1946 drama films
1940s French-language films
Films directed by Jacques de Baroncelli
Pathé films
French black-and-white films
Italian black-and-white films
1940s French films
1940s Italian films